Noctography may refer to:

 Means of writing using tactile, rather than visual, feedback:
 Noctograph, using a stylus and a guide for maintaining straight line of characters 
 Nyctography, with pattern of square holes, each used as a guide for encoding one letter via dots at the square's vertices and lines along its edges
 Noctography (photographic technique)